Physostegia correllii is a species of flowering plant in the mint family known by the common name Correll's false dragonhead. It is native to northern Mexico, as well as Texas and Louisiana in the United States. Most occurrences are historical and have not been seen recently. Today it is known from one location in Travis County, Texas, and two or three locations in Louisiana, and its current distribution in Mexico is unknown.

This rhizomatous perennial herb may reach heights over 2 meters. It produces spikes of flowers in June through September. The flowers are purple with darker streaks. The flowers are pollinated by bumblebees.

This plant is a wetland species that can be found today in wet, disturbed areas such as drainage ditches.

References

External links
USDA Plants Profile

Lamiaceae
Flora of Louisiana
Flora of Texas
Flora of North America